is a Japanese former professional footballer who plays as a midfielder.

Club career
Hashimoto was born in Osaka on 21 May 1979. He joined J1 League club Gamba Osaka from youth team in 1998. He played many matches as right-side midfielder and defensive midfielder from 2001. He became a regular player as defensive midfielder from 2003 and one of the central player under manager Akira Nishino. In 2005, Gamba won the champions in J1 League first time in the club history. After that, Gamba won the many title, 2007 J.League Cup, 2008 and 2009 Emperor's Cup. In Asia, Gamba also won the champions in 2008 AFC Champions League and the 3rd place in 2008 Club World Cup. This is the golden era in the club history. However he could hardly play in the match for injury in 2011 and left the club end of 2011 season.

In 2012, Hashimoto moved to Vissel Kobe. Although he played many matches, the club finished at the 16th place of 18 clubs in 2012 season and was relegated to J2 League. In 2013 season, the club won the 2nd place and returned to J1. He played many matches until 2014 and left the club end of 2014 season. In 2015, he moved to J2 club Cerezo Osaka. However he could not play many matches. In July 2016, he moved to J3 League club AC Nagano Parceiro and played many matches. In 2017, he moved to J2 club Tokyo Verdy.

On 10 January 2019, Hashimoto joined Japan Football League club FC Imabari.

National team career
His first cap as a full international came when he substituted Keita Suzuki on 1 June 2007 in a friendly against Montenegro. He was a member of the Japan team for 2007 Asian Cup and played one game as a substitute. He played 15 games for Japan until 2010.

Club statistics
.

Includes FIFA Club World Cup, Fuji Xerox Super Cup

FIFA Club World Cup career statistics

National team statistics

Team honors
AFC Champions League (1): 2008
J1 League (2): 2005
Emperor's Cup (2): 2008, 2009
J.League Cup (1): 2007
Japanese Super Cup (1): 2007

References

External links

 
 Japan National Football Team Database
 
 

1979 births
Living people
Association football people from Osaka Prefecture
Japanese footballers
Japan international footballers
J1 League players
J2 League players
J3 League players
Japan Football League players
Gamba Osaka players
Vissel Kobe players
Cerezo Osaka players
Cerezo Osaka U-23 players
AC Nagano Parceiro players
Tokyo Verdy players
FC Imabari players
2007 AFC Asian Cup players
Sportspeople from Osaka
Association football midfielders